Inese Šlesere (born 2 August 1972, in Riga) is a Latvian politician and former model and beauty queen. She was the runner-up in the 1999 Mrs. World and a contestant in Miss World 1991. She was a member of the Latvian Parliament from 2002 to 2011. Since 2010, she is the main organizer of the annual Latvian Prayers breakfast. She is married and has five children.

References

1972 births
Living people
Models from Riga
Latvia's First Party politicians
Latvia's First Party/Latvian Way politicians
Deputies of the 8th Saeima
Deputies of the 9th Saeima
Deputies of the 10th Saeima
Latvian female models
Miss World 1991 delegates
Latvian beauty pageant winners
Spouses of politicians
University of Latvia alumni

21st-century Latvian women politicians
Women deputies of the Saeima
Politicians from Riga
Beauty queen-politicians